Lopharcha psathyra is a species of moth of the family Tortricidae. It is found in Japan on the islands of Kyushu, Honshu and Shikoku.

There are at least two generations per year with adults on wing from late April to mid-June and from mid-July to September.

The larvae bore into the fruits of Neolitsea sericea. They have brownish-yellow and a brown head. Full-grown larvae reach a length of about 13 mm. Pupation takes place in a cocoon.

References

Moths described in 1989
Lopharcha
Moths of Japan